Night People is an album by the American R&B musician Lee Dorsey, released in 1978. It was Dorsey's final studio album, although a few country-influenced tunes were recorded before his death in 1986.

Although the album failed to chart, the title track peaked at No. 93 on the Billboard Hot Soul Singles chart.

Production
The album was produced by Allen Toussaint, with whom Dorsey had collaborated many times over the years. Toussaint also wrote the album's songs. The producer used Chocolate Milk, a New Orleans band, as Dorsey's backup musicians. Irma Thomas provided backing vocals.

Critical reception

Robert Christgau deemed the album "astonishingly listenable," writing that "Dorsey's subtle, small-scale rock and roll genre statement defines songwriter-producer Toussaint better than Toussaint the performer ever has." Texas Monthly called the title track "a mad celebration of soul-stomping, pressure-cooking Crescent City spirit." High Fidelity wrote that "Dorsey is in fine shape for the bouncy, frequently humorous songs."

AllMusic called the album "a shade too slick, with hints of disco and a couple of rare mawkish misfires by Allen Toussaint."

Track listing

References

1978 albums
Albums produced by Allen Toussaint